The .450 Black Powder Express also known as the .450 3-inch BPE was a popular black powder cartridge in the late 19th and early 20th century.

Design
The .450 Black Powder Express is a rimmed, straight walled, centerfire rifle cartridge designed for use with blackpowder.

The .450 Nitro for Black is the same cartridge loaded with mild loadings of modern smokeless powder, carefully balanced through trial to replicate the ballistics of the black powder version.

Dimensions

History
In 19th century Britain there were a large number of straight .450 cartridges developed of varying case lengths up to the 3-inch version.  The .450 3-inch Black Powder Express was originally developed by Alexander Henry as an experimental military cartridge for the 1869 British Army rifle trials that led to adoption of the Martini–Henry rifle.  The original military trial "long chamber" cartridge was loaded with a bullet weighing , although for military use it was found to be awkwardly long and difficult to handle and to load, in response Eley Brothers developed the much shorter, bottlenecked .577/450 Martini–Henry cartridge.

In the 1870s the .450 3-inch "long chamber" cartridge became the basis for the .450 Black Powder Express when loaded with lighter projectiles fired at higher velocities than the original. The .450 Black Powder Express was the most popular sporting Express cartridge and was manufactured in the UK, France, Germany, Austria and Canada and was readily available in both black powder and Nitro for Black versions well into the 20th century.

Parent case
Around 1880 this cartridge was necked down to .405 inch to make the .450/400 Black Powder Express which in turn, when loaded with cordite, became the .450/400 Nitro Express which was further developed into the .400 Jeffery Nitro Express.

Nitro Express loadings
In 1898 John Rigby & Company loaded this cartridge with smokeless cordite to create the .450 Nitro Express, the first Nitro Express cartridge.

Use
The .450 3-inch Black Powder Express was one of the most popular cartridges ever devised, it was widely used to shoot deer and similar sized game, as well as large dangerous game up to and including elephant.

Frederick Selous owned a single barrelled .450 Black Powder Express by Alexander Henry which he used to shoot lion when low on ammunition for his favourite .461 Gibbs No 1 Farquharson rifle.

John "Pondoro" Taylor owned two rifles in .450 Black Powder Express, a single falling block rifle and a double rifle by Holland & Holland, with these rifles he killed elephant, rhinoceros and buffalo shooting 365 grain hardened lead bullets, and lion shooting soft solid lead bullets of the same weight.

See also
 Express (weaponry)
 List of rifle cartridges
 11 mm caliber other cartridges of similar caliber size.

References

External links

 Cartridgecollector, ".450 3 " Coiled Black Powder Express", www.cartridgecollector.net retrieved 16 December 2016.
 Cartridgecollector, ".450 3 " Drawn Black Powder Express", www.cartridgecollector.net, retrieved 16 December 2016.
 Cartridgecollector, ".450 3 " Nitro for Black Powder", www.cartridgecollector.net, retrieved 16 December 2016.

Pistol and rifle cartridges
British firearm cartridges